Achmad Rizal Zakaria (23 April 1963 – 8 October 2021) was an Indonesian politician. A member of the Great Indonesia Movement Party, he served as Vice-Mayor of Mojokerto from 2018 to 2021. He became ill on 8 October 2021 during an official activity and subsequently died.

References

1963 births
2021 deaths
Indonesian politicians
Great Indonesia Movement Party politicians
People from Mojokerto